The Kawasaki Heavy Industries C151 is the first generation electric multiple unit (EMU) rolling stock in operation on the North–South and East–West lines of Singapore's Mass Rapid Transit (MRT) system, manufactured by a consortium led by Kawasaki Heavy Industries (KHI) under Contract 151. They were first introduced in 1987 and are the oldest trains in operation on the network.

Sixty-six trainsets consisting of six cars each and a single money train set consisting of four cars were contracted in 1984. They were manufactured from 1986 to 1989 in batches by a Japanese consortium consisting of the namesake Kawasaki, Nippon Sharyo, Tokyu Car Corp and Kinki Sharyo following a round of intense competitive bidding by international rolling stock manufacturers.

The trains underwent a two-year mid-life interior refurbishment programme by Hyundai Rotem. After the 2011 major train disruptions on 15 and 17 December 2011, further plans to upgrade its mechanical components to increase its reliability were made. The first trainset to receive this upgrade, which included a replacement traction system to PMSM, entered service in July 2015.

The R151 trains will gradually replace all of the first-generation C151 trains from 2022, with the latter to be entirely superseded by 2026.

Operational history

Tendering process
With construction of the Mass Rapid Transit system underway in 1983, Contract 151 called for the procurement of rolling stock—150 cars in Phase I and an option for 246 cars in Phase II. In what the Financial Times described as "a time when manufacturers were begging for orders" for the global rolling stock market, competition for the contract was intense. At least eight companies from around the world submitted bids for what they had nicknamed the "Big One". Bidders included Metro-Cammell with Singapore Automotive Engineering, Kawasaki with three Japanese manufacturers, MAN with AEG, Siemens and Brown, Boveri & Cie, Francorail with Alsthom-Alantique, SOFRETU and Singapore Shipbuilding and Engineering, ASEA with Sembawang Shipyard, and a Bombardier Transportation-led consortium with Hawker Siddeley Canada and Brown Boveri Canada.

Competition for the contract was so fierce that it involved last-minute discounts, offers of free parts and allegations of sabotage. Metro-Cammell, Kawasaki and ASEA were shortlisted for the final round. Metro-Cammell based its design on the Hong Kong MTR M-Train EMU and proposed to use the GEC Traction camshaft resistance control propulsion system had they won the contract. Metro-Cammell also delivered a concept mock-up and was originally the favourite to win the contract. However, analysts became concerned that a measuring error involving the London Underground 1983 Stock during the evaluation period could jeopardise their bid.

In 1984, the Japanese consortium of Kawasaki with Nippon Sharyo, Tokyu Car Corp and Kinki Sharyo was awarded Contract 151 at a cost of S$581.5 million for the construction of 396 passenger cars. Kawasaki won the contract; its bid — aided by favourable financing from Mitsui and extremely positive economic conditions in Japan — was 12% lower than those of other bidders, and the 50% lower energy usage of the Mitsubishi GTO-VVVF traction motors in comparison to the GEC Traction camshaft resistance control motors then used on the MTR M-Train EMU was also a major factor in said consortium being awarded the contract. The award was the largest single contract awarded in the initial construction of the system. Kawasaki also promised to supply $20.9m worth of complimentary spare parts after delivery. The loss of Contract 151 was a massive financial blow to Metro-Cammell, who were forced to reduce their workforce by half later that year.

Initial construction
A mock-up was manufactured in Japan after Kawasaki won the contract. It was shipped to Singapore and put on public display during the 1984 National Exhibition held in November 1984 at World Trade Centre. The mock-up featured three choices of seating arrangements and colour schemes; members of the public were invited to give feedback on these options. The finalised interior design of the C151 trains consisted of a fully longitudinal seating arrangement. The bucket seats were made of plastic; glass partitions separated the seating areas from the passenger doors. Strap lines for standing passengers were installed in the middle of every car. The colour scheme of each adjacent car's interior is distinct to make car identification in cases of fault reporting easier for passengers. Originally the colour scheme of the driving trailer cars was orange, that of the second and fifth motor cars was blue, and that of the two centre motor cars was green. There were nine seats between two doors; this was reduced to seven after the first round of refurbishment.

While the rolling stock and Mitsubishi Electric propulsion equipment were constructed in Japan, many parts were sourced from Europe. The trains were fitted with Stone Platt air-conditioning, Duewag bogies, Narita Mfg gangways and detrainment doors, Scharfenberg couplers and Westinghouse brakes. Mitsubishi Electric's propulsion equipment, which was also used on the Tokyo Metro 03 series and Tokyo Metro 05 series, was estimated to consume 50% less electricity than Hong Kong's existing MTR M-Train EMU. Its Automatic Train Control (ATC) signalling system was supplied by Westinghouse, capable of running at pre-programmed speeds and activated by the train driver. While theoretically possible to design for a fully driverless operation using this signalling technology, MRT Corporation (MRTC, now SMRT Corporation) decided against this option. The trainsets were assembled in Kobe, Japan, and then shipped to Singapore by Neptune Orient Lines. The first trainset was delivered to MRTC on 8 July 1986 at Bishan Depot, officiated by Yeo Ning Hong.

The C151 was also the basis for the Taipei Metro C301 built from 1992 to 1994 by the Kawasaki-led Union Rail Car Partnership for the Taipei Metro Tamsui-Xinyi Line.

Between 1994 and 1996, original rail wheels of all 66 C151 trains were progressively replaced with German made rail wheels equipped with absorbers that dampens vibrations on the wheels in motion. The replacement were made at a cost of $5.4 million, and were part of the enhancement works in conjunction with the commencement of the Woodlands extension.

First refurbishment

On 3 September 2004, Hyundai Rotem, Mitsui, RM Transit Technology and dU LexBuild received an order to refurbish all 396 carriages, costing S$142.7 million in total. The works included the refurbishment of interior fixtures, the addition of wheelchair spaces, the upgrading of onboard communications equipment, enhancement of the public announcement system, and general improvement of the cars' appearance. SMRT Corporation said the reasons for refurbishment were wear and damage of important components over the past two decades and water leaks from the air-conditioning system on some trains. The company chose this option instead of buying new rolling stock, which would have cost S$792 million. The first refurbished train began revenue service on 5 November 2006, and all remaining trainsets had been refurbished by the end of 2008.

The refurbished trains use the new "Blackbird" livery scheme from the C751B and then carried on to the C151A rolling stock. The interior fittings were replaced with white walls and new seats and installed further back to allow more standing space. The colour of seats in the driving trailer was changed from orange to red. Four of seven seats per row were designated as priority seats and were differentiated using a darker colour; the practice of distinguishing priority seats with a darker colour is also seen on Taipei Metro trains.

The Mitsubishi Electric propulsion system was retained, having performed better than expected. The wheelchair space was made available on the end of two mid-train cars, nearest to the elevators in elevated stations. LED lights that blink to warn passengers of closing doors were introduced in the upper middle section of the door. Additional loudspeakers and advertisement panels were also introduced. Hand grips were moved to the support bars of the seats on the ceiling and grabpoles were located near the doors and at both ends of each car. The air-conditioning system was modified to match the system used in the C751B cars, with air-conditioning vents and in-flow fans installed.

In November 2008, SMRT Corporation and Land Transport Authority (LTA) announced that the last ten refurbished trainsets would have one-third of their seats replaced with metal rails to create extra standing space. The move was justified on grounds of allowing more standing space on board during peak-hour services. The reduction of seats per row from nine to seven after refurbishment was already unpopular among commuters; the decision to further reduce seating capacity drew sharp criticism against the operator and LTA. As of December 2015, all 66 C151s from one-third of their seats have been replaced by metal bars to create extra standing space.

Second refurbishment and replacement
Following major train disruptions on 15 and 17 December 2011, the Committee of Inquiry (COI) found that despite the first refurbishment of the C151 rolling stock, "there does not appear to be any upgrade in terms of engineering components". The COI was particularly critical of the inadequate and ageing emergency battery installed on the C151 and recommended the installation of a Train Integrated Management System (TIMS) found on the C751B and C151A trains.

In response, SMRT announced it was replacing important engineering components on the oldest C151 and C651 trains. This included changing the existing Mitsubishi Electric propulsion system for the newer Insulated-gate bipolar transistor (IGBT) and Permanent Magnet Synchronous Motor (PMSM) propulsion system by Toshiba, technology currently used in the Tokyo Metro's 1000 series and 16000 series trains as well as the JR Kyushu 305 series and Hankyu 1000 series trains.In July 2015, two trains were trialed with the new propulsion system on the Changi Airport Extension. The trial was successful and was ported to the C651 refurbishment from 2016 to 2018, while four other trains were rolled out with PMSM all the way till August 2017. The replacement of traction motors into Toshiba PMSM was terminated prematurely by SMRT Corporation in September 2018 due to the New Rail Financing Framework (NRFF). In tandem with the replacement of the signalling system on the East-West Line and North-South Line with the newer Thales SelTrac signalling system, new equipment are installed in the passenger compartment of the trailer cars.

In January 2016, LTA had announced to replace all trains with the new R151 trains. On 13 April 2017, LTA released a tender for contract R151, which will be the replacement train for all the oldest MRT trains. On 25 July 2018, the contract R151 was awarded to Bombardier Transportation at a sum of $1.2 billion, inclusive of a long-term service support package for up to 30 years. 106 R151 trains will subsequently replace all 66 C151 trains from 2022 onwards while the C151 trains are being decommissioned.

Withdrawal and preservation
The withdrawal of the KHI C151 sets commenced on 22 June 2020 and will be completed by 2026. However, LTA intends for some train cars to be preserved by several public and private organisations, such as schools for educational and training purposes. In addition, some train cars may also be converted into recreational spaces while the rest of the train cars will be scrapped.

Operational details

Money train
Kawasaki built a four-car unit to serve as a money train. Since 2003, this train was decommissioned with the change to stored value cards, and in 2006, this train was being taken out from revenue service. Both set 301 and 302 are used by the Singapore Armed Forces (SAF) for training purposes, located near Poyan Reservoir.

Passenger announcement and information systems
These trains originally had no visual passenger information systems; station announcements had to be made by the train operator. An automatic audio announcement system using voice synthesizers was installed on each train by September 1994. The first iteration of the door closing buzzer announcements, which replaced the initial door chimes, was fully introduced by April 1997.

SMRT first attempted to install a passenger information system SMRTime on trains using LCD displays in 1999; these have since been removed. In November 2006 the doors of three cars (carriage number 1006, 2006 and 3006) were installed with a dynamic, in-train system displaying station information for testing; these are similar to ones used by Hong Kong's MTR. An initial prototype of STARIS based upon the existing Automatic Transit Info System was developed in-house; this was removed before the end of the year without entering service.

Two years later, four units of vacuum fluorescent displays (VFD) were mounted on the ceiling and eight units of dynamic route maps were mounted above every door in each car of trainset 053/054 for a two-month trial. This new SMRT Active Route Map Information System (STARiS) was then progressively introduced to all C151 trainsets, and subsequently to C651 and C751B trains for a cost of S$12 million—S$20,000 per car. It became standard equipment on all new rolling stocks subsequently introduced on the East-West Line and North-South Line.

Livery and numbering

The cars had an aluminium-alloy double-skinned construction, and were delivered unpainted to save time. A red adhesive strip ran through the length of the cars in the middle to match the operator's visual branding. The unpainted cars had a shiny appearance upon delivery, but as dirt and grime accumulated it became a recurring problem for the operator and attracted several public complaints. In response, MRT Corporation built a wash machine at Bishan Depot in an attempt to clean up the cars' exterior proper. After refurbishment, the problem was solved by covering the cars' exterior entirely with giant stickers, creating a livery that is similar to the newer C751B and C151A rolling stocks.

The configuration of a C151 in revenue service is DT-M1-M2-M2-M1-DT

The car numbers of the trains range from x001 to x132, where x depends on the carriage type. Individual cars are assigned a 4 digit serial number. A complete six-car trainset consists of an identical twin set of one driving trailer (DT) and two motor cars (M1 & M2) permanently coupled together. For example, set 025/026 consists of carriages 3025, 1025, 2025, 2026, 1026 and 3026.

 The first digit identifies the car number, where the first car has a 3, the second has a 1 & the third has a 2.
 The second digit is always a 0 or 1, part of the identification numbers
 The third digit and fourth digit are the train identification numbers. A full-length train of 6 cars has 2 different identification numbers. For example 025/026 (normal coupling) or 025/036 (cross-coupling).
 Kawasaki Heavy Industries built sets 001–020, 051–062, and 093–102
 Kinki Sharyo built sets 021–030, 063–072, and 103–112
 Nippon Sharyo built sets 031–040, 073–082, and 113–122
 Tokyu Car Corporation built sets 041–050, 083–092, and 123–132

Operational incidents

Major incidents
Since its introduction, C151 rolling stock has been involved in four high-profile incidents:
Clementi rail accident: On 5 August 1993 two C151 trains collided at Clementi station because of a  oil spillage on the track by a maintenance locomotive, resulting in 132 injuries.
 On 17 May 2010, Oliver Fricker trespassed and vandalised Car 1048 with graffiti at Changi Depot. The graffiti was initially mistaken for an advertisement and was not spotted until the car was filmed and the video was uploaded to YouTube by a railway enthusiast. Fricker was convicted and sentenced to seven months' imprisonment and caning. The public perceived this incident to have serious security implications, as the depot was considered a sensitive installation.
 In a major MRT disruption on 15 December 2011, one C151 train (T139 in the COI) was stalled in the tunnel and its backup battery failed. The passenger compartments in T139 experienced a blackout and loss of ventilation, leading to one passenger smashing a train door window to avoid suffocation. The battery failure led to criticism by the COI on the condition of the aging emergency batteries installed on all C151 trains. SMRT has since proposed an upgrading plan to address this issue.
 Pasir Ris rail accident: On 22 March 2016, 2 SMRT maintenance trainees were run over and killed by an oncoming C151 train (EMU 073/074) reportedly travelling at 60 km/h, 150 metres from Pasir Ris station, at approximately 11.10 am. The maintenance staff were a group of 15 personnel tasked to investigate a possible signalling system fault on the tracks near the Pasir Ris MRT Station. This incident had led to a 2.5 hour train service disruption and at least 10,000 commuters were affected.

Other incidents
On 25 May 2012, a C151 train's glass window panel was reported to had shattered on its own at Admiralty station, causing no casualties.

In popular culture
The train is featured in tvN series Little Women. It is also featured in Mediacorp series Third Rail, using the decommissioned units at Changi Exhibition Centre.

Notes

References

External links

Mass Rapid Transit (Singapore) rolling stock
Kawasaki multiple units
Tokyu Car multiple units
Train-related introductions in 1987
750 V DC multiple units
Kinki Sharyo multiple units
Nippon Sharyo multiple units